Python compiler may refer to:

 Python, a native code compiler for CMU Common Lisp
 One of several compiler implementations for the Python programming language: see Python implementations